This list of mines in Africa is subsidiary to the list of mines article and lists working, defunct and future mines on the continent and is organised by the primary country location. For practical purposes stone, marble and other quarries may be included in this list.

Algeria

Angola

Botswana

Burkina Faso

Cameroon

Egypt

Lesotho

Diamond
Letseng diamond mine
Liqhobong diamond mine

Liberia

Iron
Bong mine

Namibia

Tin
Uis mine

Mauritania

Uranium
A238 mine

Niger

Gold
Samira Hill Gold Mine

Uranium
Adrar Emoles mine
Arlit mine
Imouraren mine
Madaouéla mine
Takardeit mine

Senegal

Iron
Falémé mine

South Africa

Tanzania

Diamond
Williamson diamond mine
gold

Zimbabwe

Diamond
Murowa diamond mine

Gold
Madziwa Mine

A